The AN/UYK-20 "Data Processing Set" was a ruggedized small computer manufactured by Univac and used by the United States Navy for small and medium-sized shipboard and shore systems built in the 1970s. It featured non-volatile magnetic core memory and was housed in a heavy-duty metal cube-shaped box which was designed to fit through a 25-inch circular hatch.

In 1972, in response to the proliferation of small computer types in the Navy's inventory, the Chief of Naval Material mandated the use of the AN/UYK-20(V) in systems requiring a small digital processor. In March 1974 the AN/UYK-20 received service approval and by late 1974 they were in use in the development of tactical systems.

Programmers and operators colloquially referred to this computer as the "Yuck Twenty."

Technical 
In addition to various uses throughout the fleet, the system was used to train the U.S. Navy's Data Systems Technicians (DS) on digital computer theory and application. The 9-month course had 4 phases and phase 3 was UYK-20. Phase 3 was broken into the following sections:
Microinstructions
Macroinstructions
Processor/Emulator
Memory
Input/Output
Graded Troubleshooting (Mids)- MIDS was the last week of Phase 3 where as the class started at 2300 hours and finished at 0630. Each night a series of faults was inserted into the UYK-20 for troubleshooting purposes. The student had to use diagnostic routines, troubleshooting techniques, and skill to find and fix the faults. The student had to pass with a majority of faults identified and fixed to move on to phase 4. Phase 3 for some was the toughest part of Data Systems A School at Mare Island, CA. I know this, because I attended A School as a DS from SEP 89 - MAY 90. Phase 2 used the training computer called the COMTRAN 10 aka "Comtrash 10".

After the dissolution of the Navy's DS rate, the primary maintenance responsibility was moved to the Electronic Technicians (ET), as the UYK-20 was already being used in several of their systems primarily the NAVMACS system.

Replacement 
The AN/UYK-20 is still currently in use, but has been largely supplanted by the AN/UYK-44, which uses a 'superset' of the UYK-20 instruction set, meaning the UYK-44 will execute all of the UYK-20 instructions, as well as several new instructions specific to the UYK-44.

See also
 AN/AYK-14
 AN/UYK-44
 CMS-2 programming language

References

External links 
AN/UYK-20 drawing
AN/UYK-20 photograph
Sperry Univac AN/UYK-20 Technical Description

UNIVAC hardware
Military computers
Military electronics of the United States
Military equipment introduced in the 1970s
16-bit computers